The 2019 Big Ten Conference women's soccer tournament is the postseason women's soccer tournament for the Big Ten Conference for the 2019 season. It was held from November 3–10, 2019. The seven-match tournament began with first-round matches held at campus sites, before moving to Yurcak Field in Piscataway, New Jersey for the semifinals and final. The eight-team single-elimination tournament consisted of three rounds based on seeding from regular-season conference play. The defending tournament champion, Minnesota, did not qualify for this year's tournament. Penn State beat Michigan in the tournament championship game in overtime 2–1. Penn State is the Big Ten Tournament Champion. It was just the sixth Big Ten final to go to overtime (first since 2018).

Seeds
Eight Big Ten schools participated in the tournament. Teams were seeded by conference record.

Bracket

Schedule

Quarterfinals

Semifinals

Final

All-Tournament team
Megan Wampler, Indiana
Riley Whitaker, Iowa
Malikae Dayes, Maryland
Sarah Stratigakis, Michigan
Sydney Shepherd, Michigan
Amanda Dennis, Penn State - Defensive Player of the Tournament
Payton Linnehan, Penn State - Offensive Player of the Tournament
Frankie Tagliaferri, Penn State
Skylurr Patrick, Purdue
Tiernny Wiltshire, Rutgers
Cameron Murtha, Wisconsin

References

External links

 
Big Ten Women's Soccer Tournament